The Paterson, Passaic and Rutherford Electric Railway was a trolley line of 40.57 miles in track length incorporated in 1893 as a consolidation of Paterson & Little Falls Electric Railway Co., Grant Street Electric Railway Co., People's Park Railway Co., Paterson & Passaic Electric Railway Co. and Passaic, Rutherford & Carlstadt Electric Railway Co. located in northern New Jersey, the company was leased from 1894–1899 to the New Jersey Electric Railway Co.

See also
 List of New Jersey street railroads
 Jersey City, Hoboken and Rutherford Electric Railway

References

Light rail in New Jersey
Defunct New Jersey railroads
New Jersey streetcar lines
Defunct public transport operators in the United States
Tram, urban railway and trolley companies
Railway companies established in 1893
Rutherford, New Jersey
1893 establishments in New Jersey